The armoured sea catfish (Hemiarius stormii) is a species of catfish in the family Ariidae. It was described by Pieter Bleeker in 1858, originally under the genus Cephalocassis. It is known from freshwater rivers in Thailand and Indonesia. Its diet consists of finfish and benthic invertebrates.

References

Ariidae
Fish described in 1858